Leptolalax zhangyapingi is a species of frog in the family Megophryidae from northern Thailand. Its type locality is Phang Num Poo, in Thep Sadet subdistrict, Doi Saket district, Chiang Mai Province, Thailand.

References

zhangyapingi
Amphibians described in 2013